Hand in Glove is a detective novel by Ngaio Marsh; it is the twenty-second novel to feature Roderick Alleyn, and was first published in 1962. This story finds its way into an upper society party gone astray into the path of precarious murder.

Television adaptation  
This novel was adapted for the television series The Inspector Alleyn Mysteries, with Patrick Malahide as Roderick Alleyn in 1994.

External links
 

Roderick Alleyn novels
1962 British novels
Collins Crime Club books
British detective novels